Thomas Webster Kemp  (27 September 1866 – 13 January 1928) was an Admiral of the Royal Navy.

in 1917 Rear Admiral Kemp was given command of the British North Russia Squadron.

References

1866 births
1928 deaths
Royal Navy admirals of World War I
Companions of the Order of the Bath
Companions of the Order of St Michael and St George
Companions of the Order of the Indian Empire